Hugh Robertson Anderson  (born 18 January 1936) is a four-time Grand Prix motorcycle road racing World Champion and a 19-time New Zealand national champion. He is also a two-time Isle of Man TT winner.

Motorcycle racing career
Growing up in Huntly, Anderson played rugby league for Huntly United alongside fellow future motorcycle champion Ginger Molloy.

He joined the Suzuki factory racing team in 1961, racing the factory's 50cc, 125cc and occasionally 250cc racers. During his team membership, Anderson was double World Champion (50cc and 125cc) in 1963 and retained his 50cc World Title the following year. In 1965, he was crowned 125cc World Championship on his factory Suzuki. Anderson's last race for the Suzuki factory was at the 1966 Japanese Grand Prix at Fisco in October 1966.

In the 1994 Queen's Birthday Honours, Anderson was appointed a Member of the Order of the British Empire, for services to motor sport. In 1995 he was inducted into the New Zealand Sports Hall of Fame.

Motorcycle Grand Prix results 

(key) (Races in italics indicate fastest lap)

References

Further reading

External links
New Zealand Sports Hall of Fame

1936 births
Living people
125cc World Championship riders
350cc World Championship riders
50cc World Championship riders
Huntly United players
Isle of Man TT riders
New Zealand Members of the Order of the British Empire
New Zealand motorcycle racers
New Zealand rugby league players
Sportspeople from Huntly, New Zealand
Rugby league players from Huntly, New Zealand
125cc World Riders' Champions